Jakub Czaja (born 12 September 1980 in Gdańsk) is a retired Polish athlete who specialised in the 3000 metres steeplechase. He represented his country at the 2004 Summer Olympics failing to qualify for the final. His biggest success is the silver medal at the 2001 Summer Universiade.

Competition record

Personal bests
Outdoor
1500 metres – 3:44.19 (Kraków 2003)
3000 metres – 7:53.92 (Warsaw 2004)
5000 metres – 13:46.53 (Firenze 2005)
10,000 metres – 28:56.50 (Międzyzdroje 2005)
3000 metres steeplechase – 8:17.49 (Paris Saint-Denis 2005)

Indoor
1500 metres – 3:47.42 (Spała 2004)
3000 metres – 8:03.53 (Spała 2002)

References

1980 births
Living people
Polish male steeplechase runners
Polish male long-distance runners
Olympic athletes of Poland
Athletes (track and field) at the 2004 Summer Olympics
Sportspeople from Gdańsk
Universiade medalists in athletics (track and field)
Universiade silver medalists for Poland
Medalists at the 2001 Summer Universiade
20th-century Polish people
21st-century Polish people